The 1987–88 NCAA football bowl games concluded the 1987 NCAA Division I-A football season, featuring 18 games. Twenty ranked teams participated, and seven of the eighteen matchups were between two ranked teams. The Miami Hurricanes were declared the national champions, after upsetting #1 Oklahoma in the Orange Bowl.

Seventeen of the bowl games ended with a winner, while there was a lone tie (Auburn vs Syracuse in the Sugar Bowl).

Nine independent teams competed, along with six SEC teams, four Big Ten, four Pac-10, three WAC, three Big 8, three SWC, two ACC, one MAC, and one PCAA.

The largest margin of victory occurred twice; Clemson beat Penn State and Texas A&M beat Notre Dame, both 35-10.

The "bowl week" started on December 13 with the California Bowl, and concluded on January 2, 1988 with the Hall of Fame Bowl and the Peach Bowl.

Bowl schedule

References